Georg Faber (5 April 1877 – 7 March 1966) was a German mathematician who introduced Faber polynomials, Faber series, the Lévy C curve, and Faber–Schauder systems.

References

External links

1877 births
1966 deaths
19th-century German mathematicians
20th-century German mathematicians
Ludwig Maximilian University of Munich alumni
University of Göttingen alumni
University of Würzburg alumni
Presidents of the Technical University of Munich
Academic staff of the University of Tübingen
Academic staff of the University of Stuttgart
Academic staff of the University of Königsberg
Academic staff of the University of Strasbourg
Academic staff of the Technical University of Munich